The Baltic Hockey League is a professional ice hockey competition based in the Baltic states featuring club teams from Estonia, Latvia and Lithuania. The competition was founded in 2018, and the first edition of the competition began in November, 2020.

History
In the early 2000s the Baltic League was formed and featured teams from the three Baltic states. The inaugural competition was won by Latvian side HK Liepājas Metalurgs, following which the competition was not held again. The Baltic Cup was held during the 2004–05 season, and also introduced a team from neighbouring Poland, this competition also only lasted one season, and marked the end of regional club competition in the Baltic states.

On November 9, 2018, the Baltic Hockey League was first announced to the public via a press conference from the Estonian, Latvian and Lithuanian ice hockey governing bodies. The first edition of the tournament was scheduled to begin in October 2019 with the final round being held in December 2019, featuring 8 clubs split into two conferences. The conferences were named after two successful players from the Baltic states, namely Darius Kasparaitis and Sandis Ozoliņš. The Lithuanian delegation confirmed that the two highest placed teams in the previous seasons Lithuania Hockey League would qualify for the tournament. Despite the initial plan for the competition to start in 2019, it wasn't until the following year that the league played its inaugural season, with 6 teams taking part.

Format

The maiden edition of the competition was separated into two rounds. The six participants were initially split into two groups of three teams. The Ozoliņš group was made up of HK Mogo, Kaunas Hockey and Tartu Välk 494 with games being played at the Astri Arena in Tartu, Estonia. The Kasparaitis group consisted of Hockey Punks Vilnius, HK Liepāja and HC Everest with the games being held at Utenos pramogų Arena in Vilnius, Lithuania. Games in both groups took place between 27 and 29 November 2020. The two best teams from each group qualifies for the final round, a round-robin competition with the team with the best record being crowned champion. Final round games were originally scheduled to take place between 18 and 20 December 2020 in Olimpiskais centrs in Rēzekne, Latvia however, on 15 December it was announced that the finals were postponed until 11–14 February 2021 as a result of several HK Mogo players having been exposed to COVID-19. As HK Mogo had recently played Liepāja in the Latvian Hockey Higher League, both sides were unable to field teams. In early February the final round was again postponed due to the pandemic, with the date to be announced when the Covid situation improves.

Teams
The 2020 edition of the Baltic Hockey League saw the following teams compete:

   HC Everest ( Tallinn, Estonia)
   HK Liepāja ( Liepaja, Latvia)
   HK Mogo ( Riga, Latvia)
   Hockey Punks Vilnius ( Vilnius, Lithuania)
   Kaunas Hockey ( Kaunas, Lithuania)
   Tartu Välk 494 ( Tartu, Estonia)

Estonian side Narva PSK were originally scheduled to be part of the competition, however they were unable to participate as a result of the COVID-19 pandemic, and subsequently HC Everest took their place.

2020 Results

First round

Group Ozoliņš

 Advance to Final round.

Results

The scheduled game between HK Mogo and Tartu Välk 494 was cancelled due to 4 Välk players testing positive for COVID-19. However, the two teams had already achieved qualification for the final round.

Group Kasparaitis
 
 Advance to Final round.

Results

Final Round

 Champion

Results

The final round was originally scheduled for 15–18 December 2020, however, it was postponed until February 2021 as a result complications arising from the COVID-19 pandemic. It was subsequently delayed a second time in early February 2021, with the date of play to be determined.

Awards and statistics

Awards
Best players selected by the directorate:
Best Goalkeeper: TBA
Best Defenseman: TBA
Best Forward: TBA
MVP: TBA 
Source: hockey.lt

Scoring leaders
List shows the top skaters sorted by points, then goals.

GP = Games played; G = Goals; A = Assists; Pts = Points; PIM = Penalties in minutes; POS = Position
Source: EliteProspects.com

See also

References

External links
 Estonian Ice Hockey Association
 Latvian Ice Hockey Federation
 Lithuanian Ice Hockey Federation

Sport in the Baltic states
Professional ice hockey leagues in Estonia
Professional ice hockey leagues in Latvia
Professional ice hockey leagues in Lithuania
Multi-national ice hockey leagues in Europe
Multi-national professional sports leagues
Top tier ice hockey leagues in Europe